Brewery Vestfyen (Danish: Bryggeriet Vestfyen) is a Danish brewery which produces Willemoes Ale, Willemoes Stout, Vestfyen Ren Pilsner, Vestfyen Pilsner, Vestfyen Classic, Willemoes Strong Lager, Willemoes Porter, Willemoes Høstbryg, Willemoes Påskebryg, Willemoes Påske Ale, Willemoes Jule Ale,  Willemoes Julebryg, Willemoes Classic, Nat-expressen, Pale Ale, Prins Kristian, Danish Pride, Påskebryg, Julebryg, Vestfyen Light Pilsner, Prima Hvidtøl; and Jolly Cola soda water.

References

Notes

Bibliography

External links

Danish brands
Danish companies established in 1885
Food and drink companies established in 1885
Breweries in Denmark